The 2005 MTV Video Music Awards aired live on August 28, 2005, honoring the best music videos from the previous year. The show was hosted by Diddy at the American Airlines Arena in Miami, Florida.  The big winner of the night was Green Day, who took home seven VMA's, including Best Rock Video, Best Group Video, Viewer's Choice, and Video of the Year.

Although the approach of a strong tropical storm (which became Hurricane Katrina prior to its first landfall just north of Miami) cancelled much of the pre-show activities, the show itself went on as scheduled after the storm passed.  Later that year, the MTV VMAs for Latin America, scheduled for Cancún, were canceled due to Hurricane Wilma (which later made an identical but reverse path across South Florida as Katrina did).

Background
MTV announced on April 5 that the 2005 Video Music Awards would be held on August 28 at the American Airlines Arena in Miami, marking the venue's second consecutive year hosting the ceremony. Nominees were announced on July 25 at a press conference hosted by Kelly Clarkson, Kanye West, and Diddy in Miami. At the same press conference, MTV announced that Diddy would host the ceremony. The ceremony had a water theme, with several water features constructed for the ceremony by WET. The ceremony broadcast was preceded by the 2005 MTV Video Music Awards Pre-Show by the Shore. Hosted by Kurt Loder and SuChin Pak with reports from John Norris, Sway, and Gideon Yago, the broadcast featured red carpet interviews and performances by Mike Jones featuring Slim Thug and Paul Wall, Rihanna, and Fall Out Boy. The ceremony was also the first to expand beyond linear television with a "My VMAs" channel on MTV Overdrive featuring bonus material both before and after the ceremony.

Performances

Appearances

Pre-show
 Kurt Loder – introduced the winners of the professional categories
 SuChin Pak – announced the winners of Best Group Video and Best Video Game Soundtrack

Main show
 Nelly and Lindsay Lohan – presented Best Female Video and Best Male Video
 Beavis and Butt-head – appeared in different vignettes about voting procedures for the Viewer's Choice award
 Ciara and Missy Elliott – introduced Ludacris and Bobby Valentino
 Orlando Bloom and Kirsten Dunst – presented Best Rock Video
 Grandmaster Flash – DJed after some commercial breaks and during the "dance-off" sequence
 Omarion and Luke (from 2 Live Crew) – appeared in a "dance-off" sequence with Diddy
 Ashlee and Jessica Simpson – presented Best R&B Video
 Jessica Alba, Dwyane Wade and Shaquille O'Neal – introduced Shakira and Alejandro Sanz
 Usher – introduced a "Clowning vs. Krumping" dance sequence and presented Best Dance Video
 Eric Roberts – introduced R. Kelly
 Hilary Duff and Joel Madden – introduced the Killers
 Lil' Kim and Jeremy Piven – presented Best Rap Video
 Common and Johnny Knoxville – presented the MTV2 Award
 Fat Joe – introduced the reggaeton performances and presented Best Hip-Hop Video
 Pharrell – introduced Coldplay
 B5 – introduced the next pair of presenters
 Ricky Martin and Joss Stone – presented Best Pop Video
 Alicia Keys and John Legend – introduced Kanye West and Jamie Foxx
 Snoop Dogg – introduced Dane Cook, who performed a short comic monologue, and presented Best New Artist in a Video with him
 Eva Longoria – introduced Mariah Carey
 Lil Jon and Paulina Rubio – presented Breakthrough Video
 Fergie and will.i.am – introduced 50 Cent
 Bow Wow and Paris Hilton – presented Viewer's Choice
 Jamie Foxx – introduced Destiny's Child and presented Video of the Year with them

Winners and nominees
Winners are in bold text.

Music

The music for the telecast was scored by Linkin Park's co-vocalist Mike Shinoda and rapper Lil Jon. The score was released as an EP on August 31, 2005, and later released by Shinoda five years later on March 1, 2010.

See also
2005 MTV Europe Music Awards

External links
Official MTV site

References

2005
MTV Video Music Awards
MTV Video Music Awards
MTV Video Music Awards
2000s in Miami